The Point Pleasant Beach School District is a comprehensive community public school district that serves students in pre-kindergarten through twelfth grade from Point Pleasant Beach, in Ocean County, New Jersey, United States.

As of the 2018–19 school year, the district, comprising two schools, had an enrollment of 763 students and 78.3 classroom teachers (on an FTE basis), for a student–teacher ratio of 9.7:1.

The district is classified by the New Jersey Department of Education as being in District Factor Group "FG", the fourth-highest of eight groupings. District Factor Groups organize districts statewide to allow comparison by common socioeconomic characteristics of the local districts. From lowest socioeconomic status to highest, the categories are A, B, CD, DE, FG, GH, I and J.

In addition to the students of Point Pleasant Beach the district serves the students of Bay Head and Lavallette for grades 9-12 and those from Mantoloking for K-12, as part of sending/receiving relationships.

Schools
Schools in the district (with 2018–19 enrollment data from the National Center for Education Statistics) are:
Elementary school
G. Harold Antrim Elementary School 384 students in grades PreK-8
Tara Weber, Principal
High School
Point Pleasant Beach High School 367 students in grades 9-12
Dr. Nathan Grosshandler, Principal

Administration
Core members of the district's administration are:
William T. Smith, Superintendent
Dr. Brian F. Savage, Business Administrator / Board Secretary

Board of education
The district's board of education, with five members, sets policy and oversees the fiscal and educational operation of the district through its administration. As a Type II school district, the board's trustees are elected directly by voters to serve three-year terms of office on a staggered basis, with either one or two seats up for election each year held (since 2012) as part of the November general election. An additional board trustee is appointed to represent Lavallette

References

External links
Point Pleasant Beach School District
 
Point Pleasant Beach School District, National Center for Education Statistics

Point Pleasant Beach, New Jersey
New Jersey District Factor Group FG
School districts in Ocean County, New Jersey